This is a year-by-year list of aviation accidents that have occurred at airshows worldwide in the 21st century.

2022 
 November 12, 2022 – A mid-air collision at the Wings Over Dallas airshow between Boeing B-17G Flying Fortress Texas Raiders and a Bell P-63 Kingcobra resulted in six fatalities.
 September 18, 2022 – An Aero L-29 Delfín crashed during lap 3 of 6 during the Jet Gold race of the Reno Air Races in Reno, Nevada. Pilot Aaron Hogue died in the crash.

2021 
 April 17, 2021 – A Grumman TBF Avenger made an emergency landing in the ocean near Patrick Space Force Base during the Cocoa Beach Air Show in Cocoa Beach, Florida. No one was injured. 
 August 20, 2021 – A North American T-6 Texan GEICO Skytypers plane crashed during preparations for the Great Pocono Raceway Airshow in Pennsylvania. Pilot Andy Travnicek died in the crash. The accident caused the entire team to lose their sponsorship with GEICO, making them disband from the airshow industry in 2022.

2020 
 May 17, 2020 — Before a public flyby of the Snowbirds in Kamloops, British Columbia, Canada, one CT-114 Tutor crashed after takeoff. Capt. Jenn Casey was killed, and Capt. Richard MacDougal was seriously injured.

2019 
 October 2 – 2019 Boeing B-17 Flying Fortress crash: A Boeing B-17 Flying Fortress owned by the Collings Foundation crashed at Bradley International Airport during the Wings of Freedom Tour due to pilot error and engine/maintenance issues. Seven occupants of the 13 on board were killed and six were injured, along with one ground injury. The aircraft was destroyed by fire.
 June 21 – Skip Stewart was forced to make an emergency landing in his Pitts S-2S after suffering an engine loss on a county road in Troy, Ohio, just  from the Dayton International Airport in Vandalia, Ohio, where he was set to take part in the Vectren Dayton Air Show.
 June 16 – Kent Pietsch and his Jelly Belly 1942 Interstate Cadet suffered damage from prop-wash that was caused by a nearby taxiing Lockheed C-130 Hercules. The Interstate Cadet is in need of repairs; the C-130 Hercules was undamaged. No one involved in this accident suffered any sort of injury.
 June 15 – A pilot was killed flying an aerobatic display in a Yakovlev Yak-52 during the Płocki Piknik Lotniczy in Płock, Poland. The aircraft appeared to enter a flat spin. Late in the spin the aircraft appears to enter a more nose-down flight attitude, a common procedure used by pilots to exit a flat spin. Unfortunately, the aircraft was too low to recover and impacted the Wisła river, killing the single crewmember on board.
 February 19 – Two BAE Systems Hawk Mk. 132 aircraft of the Surya Kiran Aerobatic Team collided midair during a rehearsal for the Aero India 2019 near the Yelahanka Air Force Station. Three people were involved in this accident. Two pilots ejected safely, the third, Cdr. Sahil Gandhi, succumbed to his injuries.
 March 3 - A USAF C-17 aborted its take-off run during the Australian International Airshow at Avalon, Victoria. Early in the take-off run, number 4 engine ingested a large bird, one of a flock of Wedgetail Eagles which had been milling around the airport. The plane suffered a major compressor stall, but was able to safely abort the take-off with emergency braking and thrust reversers on the undamaged engines.

2018 
October 12 – Jon Thocker, a member of the Redline Airshows Aerobatic Team, was killed when his Van's RV-8 crashed while performing a nighttime aerobatic routine at Culpeper Airfest in Culpeper, Virginia.
July 7 – A MiG-21 LanceR crashed at the Borcea Air Base in Southern Romania. The pilot, Florin Rotaru, was killed.
June 2 – Dan Buchanan, a hang glider pilot, was killed during the Gunfighter Skies Air and Space Celebration at Mountain Home Air Force Base.
May 30 – Ken Johansen, a member of the GEICO Skytypers team, was killed when his SNJ-2 aircraft crashed in Melville, New York, on Long Island.
April 25 – Eglin Wells, an aerobatic pilot from Atlanta, Georgia, was killed when his custom-designed and -built Starjammer aircraft crashed while practicing for the Zhengzhou Air Show.
April 4   – Maj Stephen Del Bagno, slot pilot, was killed when his aircraft, Thunderbird No. 4, crashed over the Nevada Test and Training Range, during a routine aerial demonstration training flight.
March 31 - Warbird pilot, Arthur Dovey, was uninjured when his Yak-3 fighter collided with ground equipment during landing from a display for the Warbirds Over Wanaka airshow.

2017 
September 24 – Capt. Gabriele Orlandi of the Italian Air Force died while performing at an air show in Terracina. The pilot did not have sufficient height to recover from a loop and his Eurofighter Typhoon crashed into the sea. 
September 2 – An Antonov An-2 crashed at an air show at Chernyoe Airport, Balashikha, Russia, after losing control while performing aerobatics, killing both pilots. The investigation found out that the Certificate of Airworthiness of the aircraft had expired in 2012. Additionally, both crew members did not have an An-2 type rating, and the aerobatics manoeuvres performed by the aircraft were not allowed on the An-2. 
July 16 – Vlado Lenoch and passenger Bethany Root were killed when their P-51D Mustang "Baby Duck" crashed in a field in Cummings, Kansas, after performing at the Amelia Earhart Festival.
June 23 – Capt. Erik Gonsalves was injured when, during landing, Thunderbird No. 8 ran off the runway and overturned prior to the Vectren Dayton Air Show. The pilot and a passenger, Technical Sgt. Kenneth Cordova, were trapped in the aircraft for over an hour. Cordova was uninjured. The investigation revealed excessive air speed coupled with landing too far down a wet runway caused the jet to leave the airstrip and flip over. Rain on the canopy windscreen and failure to follow proper braking procedures during the landing contributed to the accident.
May 28 – Petty officer, first class Remington Peters, a member of the United States Navy Parachute Team "Leap Frogs", died when his parachute malfunctioned and did not open while he was performing at Fleet Week New York City. 
May 14 – Chris Burkett, a member of the Twister Aerobatics Team, who was piloting the Silence SA1100 Twister at the time had to make an emergency landing following an engine failure while participating in the Abingdon Air & Country Show in Abingdon, Oxfordshire, United Kingdom. The aircraft is in need of repairs and the pilot suffered minor injuries.
January 28 – A pilot was forced to make a wheels up landing in the Chance-Vought F4U-5N Corsair he was flying due to a failure of its hydraulic system. The incident happened at the Hunter Valley Airshow in Rutherford, New South Wales, Australia.
January 26 –  Australia Day celebrations (Perth, Australia) – A Grumman G-73 Mallard flying boat (VH-CQA), crashed into the Swan River in Perth, Australia during Australia Day celebrations. The pilot Peter Lynch and passenger Endah Cakrawati died on impact.
January 14 – Hat Yai Airshow during Children Day (Hat Yai, Thailand) – Pilot Dilokrit Pattavee died when his Saab JAS 39 Gripen number 70108 crashed at the Hat Yai Airshow in Hat Yai, Thailand.

2016 
August 27 – Alaska-native pilot Marcus Paine was killed when his 450 Stearman biplane crashed during the Airshow of the Cascades in Madras, Oregon.
August 14 – Herne Bay, Kent – A pilot suffered minor injuries when his plane crashed and flipped over near the shore during an airshow.
July 22 – Aerobatic pilot Randy Harris and passenger Dale Shillington were killed when their Skybolt Biplane lost control and crashed in a field near Vance AFB in Oklahoma.
July 17 – A T-28 crashed at The Cold Lake Air Show in Alberta, Canada, killing the pilot, Bruce Evans, upon impact with the ground.
July 13 – Mesmer Family Block Party (Grand Island, New York) – Skydiver Jeffrey Antonich was seriously injured when he experienced a hard landing while performing during a privately held airshow in front of an estimated 1,000 spectators.
June 5  – A de Havilland Tiger Moth crashed at Brimpton Airfield near Reading, England, injuring a spectator at a fly-in to raise funds for the local air ambulance.
 June 2  – Major Alex Turner, flying Thunderbird No. 6, crashed in a field near Colorado Springs, Colorado, after performing a flyover at the United States Air Force Academy graduation ceremony. The F-16 pilot ejected and was unhurt. Investigation revealed that the aircraft's engine was inadvertently shutdown at the start of landing procedures when a faulty throttle trigger permitted the throttle to be rotated into an engine cut-off position.
June 2  – Capt. Jeff "Kooch" Kuss of the Blue Angels died just after takeoff while performing the Split-S maneuver in his F/A-18 Hornet during a practice run for The Great Tennessee Air Show in Smyrna, Tennessee. The Navy investigation found that Capt. Kuss performed the maneuver at too low of an altitude while failing to retard the throttle out of afterburner, causing him to fall too fast and recover at too low of an altitude. Capt. Kuss ejected, but his parachute was immediately engulfed in flames, causing him to fall to his death. Kuss' body was recovered multiple yards away from the crash site. The cause of death was blunt force trauma to the head. The investigation also cites weather and pilot fatigue as additional causes to the crash.
May 28 – Pilot Bill Gordon died when his P-47 Thunderbolt "Jacky's Revenge" crash landed in the Hudson River.
May 14 – Aerobatic pilot Greg Connell crashed and died during a performance at the Good Neighbor Day Air Show at DeKalb-Peachtree Airport.
April 17 – Guatemalan pilot Juan Miguel García Salas died when his Extra EA-300L aerobatics plane crashed in a wooded area near Aeródromo Capitán Eduardo Toledo while performing at the Cozumel Aero Show in Cozumel, Quintana Roo, Mexico.

2015 
December 20 – Air Force Flight School (Yogyakarta, Indonesia) – Both pilots, Pilot Lt. Col. Marda Sarjono and Capt. Diwi Cahyadi, were killed when their aircraft, a KAI T-50I Golden Eagle, crashed.
October 18 – Wings Over Houston Air Show (Harris County, Texas) – A skydiver was injured when he landed on a supply tent. It was reported that he did not hear the order cancelling the formation jump due to high winds.
 September 12 – An Aero L-39 Albatros jet, piloted by Jay "Flash" Gordon of Louisville, Kentucky, crashed approximately two minutes after take-off at the Wings Over Big South Fork Air & Car Show in Scott County, Tennessee due to an engine loss. The pilot was pronounced dead on scene.
 August 22 – 2015 Shoreham Airshow crash – A Hawker Hunter T7 (G-BXFI/WV372) crashed onto the A27 arterial road (dual carriageway) between Lancing and Shoreham-by-Sea, West Sussex, England, while taking part in the 2015 Shoreham Airshow. Eleven people on the ground were killed and several others, including the pilot of the plane, were injured. Witnesses told local TV that the jet appeared to have crashed when it failed to pull out of a loop maneuver. The pilot, standing trial in 2019 for manslaughter, claimed having become incapacitated by severe g-forces; he was acquitted of all charges.
 August 15 – Sgt. First Class Corey Hood, 32, a member of the United States Army Parachute Team "Golden Knights" team died at Northwestern Memorial Hospital one day after he was critically injured when he struck an apartment building and fell to the ground following a mid-air collision with another parachutist belonging to the United States Navy Parachute Team "Leap Frogs" at the Chicago Air & Water Show.
 August 1 – CarFest, Kevin Whyman died after his Folland Gnat T Mk1 crashed into the ground.The aircraft was carrying out an aileron roll at low level during a flying display when, at an angle of bank of 107° to the left, t.he nose attitude dropped relative to the horizon. The pilot reversed the direction of roll but also applied a large pitch input which increased the rate of descent, and caused the aircraft to depart controlled flight and impact with the ground.
 June 27 – Steven O’Berg died when his Pitts S2-B biplane spun into the ground at the Cameron Airshow.
June 27 - Minnesota Air Spectacular (Mankato, Minnesota) - Two people received slight injuries when a six-year-old boy accidentally started a Eurocopter EC145 medical transport helicopter that was on display at the airshow.
February 19 – Aero India (Bangalore, India) – Two Zlín Z-50ZLX of the Flying Bulls Aerobatic Team contacted each other. Both aircraft landed safely.

2014 
 September 21 – Francesco Fornabaio died at the age of 57 during the "Fly Venice 2014" at the Giovanni Nicelli Airport in Venice, Italy, in his Extreme 3000.
 July 31 – A Hawker Sea Fury performing the penultimate display at the Culdrose Air Day crash landed after an engine problem possibly due to lack of hydraulics. The crash was minor and the pilot survived.
 June 29 – Flying Circus Aerodrome, Bealeton, Virginia – While performing a routine act in the Flying Circus Airshow, a Waco UPF-7 biplane experienced a total loss of power and was forced to make an emergency landing in an adjacent field. However, the landing roll was too fast for the pilot to safely stop the aircraft before it impacted a tree grove at the edge of the field, totally destroying the aircraft. The pilot managed to escape and walk away with minor injuries.
 June 29 – The Shuttleworth Collection's Sopwith Triplane hit a fencepost on landing near the Old Warden airfield, Bedfordshire, and ended up on its nose. The pilot, Roger 'Dodge' Bailey, escaped unhurt, but the aircraft suffered wing, undercarriage and propeller damage.
 June 1 – Bill Cowden died during the Stevens Point Airshow at the Stevens Point Municipal Airport in Stevens Point, Wisconsin in his Yakovlev Yak-55M.
 May 4 – Eddie Andreini was killed during Thunder Over Solano airshow at the Travis Air Force Base in Solano County, California in his highly modified PR13D Super Stearman. The fatal accident occurred when he was attempting his signature low-altitude inverted ribbon cutting maneuver.
 March 7 – Tamás Nádas died at the Qatar Mile event at the Al Khor Airport in Al Khor, Qatar. The fatal accident occurred when he was doing an inverted low pass in his Zivko Edge 540. While in the inverted position, he lost control of his aircraft and plummeted to the ground.

2013 
 October 12 – Glen Dell suffered severe burns when his Extra EA-300 crashed at the Secunda Airshow in Secunda, Mpumalanga. A few hours later he died of his injuries at the local hospital. 
 August 17 – An Interstate L-6 Cadet crashed during takeoff while performing at the Lancaster Community Days Air Show at the Lancaster Airport in Lancaster, Pennsylvania. The pilot appears to be fine. 
 June 29 – 2013 Eberswalde-Finow Zlin crash – unnamed pilot, 47, who was piloting the Zlín Z-526AFS Akrobat at the Rock 'N' Race in Finowfurt, Germany died when the airplane crashed.
 June 23 – John Klatt was forced to land his MX Aircraft MXS after he experienced an engine failure. He released the aircraft's canopy, which had become coated with oil, in order to regain forward visibility to land. He suffered some minor burns and bruises, but was otherwise fine. The aircraft was in need of repairs.
 June 22 – Pilot Charlie Schwenker and wingwalker Jane Wicker were killed when Wicker's Boeing-Stearman IB75A struck the ground and burst into flames while performing at the Vectren Dayton Air Show at the Dayton International Airport in Vandalia, Ohio. The fatal accident occurred when the Stearman was transitioning to a low-level inverted pass, with Wicker hanging upside down by her ankles off the lower wing (but sitting right-side up while inverted). While flying inverted from the southeast to the northwest in front of the spectators, the aircraft's nose pitched slightly above the horizon. The aircraft abruptly rolled to the right and impacted terrain in a descending left-wing-low attitude. A post-impact fire ensued and consumed a majority of the right wing and front half of the fuselage.
 May 19 – Murat Öztürk crashed his plane while participating for the weekend's Adana Air Show organized to celebrate national public holiday in Turkey.
 May 5 - Pilot Ladislao Tejedor Romero was killed when his Hispano Aviación HA-200 crashed during the accident at the Fundacion Infante de Orleans airshow, in Cuatro Vientos, Madrid.
 April 7 – First Lieutenant Rafael Sanchez and Second Lieutenant Carlos Manuel Guerrero crashed an ENAER T-35 Pillán while participating in the Show Aéreo del Caribe in Santo Domingo, Dominican Republic. The aircraft pulled up and rolled inverted, but failed to recover from the dive following the maneuver. The pilot rolled upright, and the aircraft impacted the water, Both pilots died.
 March 17 – Roger Stokes, who was flying a Supermarine Aircraft Spitfire Mk26, an 80% scale home-build replica of the Supermarine Spitfire, died when it crashed into a fence between two businesses in a commercial area on Frost Road in the nearby suburb of Salisbury, while completing a routine at the Classic Jets Original Parafield Airshow at Parafield Airport in Parafield, South Australia.
 January 23 – Kirby Chambliss crashed his Zivko Edge 540 while participating for the weekend's Ilopango Air Show in El Salvador. The incident happened when he was executing a formation high alpha pass and crashed at the end of the runway as the engine quit. The airplane was a total loss and Chambliss survived with bumps and bruises.

2012 

 September 29 – An AS/SA 202 Bravo piloted by Nurman Lubis and Tonny Haryono, owned by the Indonesian Aerosport Federation, crashed because the plane appeared to be flying too low during its aerobatic routine and spun "out of control" before it hit the structure at the Bandung Air Show at the Husein Sastranegara International Airport in. Both pilots died.
 September 11 – A highly modified Hawker Sea Fury, nicknamed "Furias," piloted by Matt Jackson made a hard emergency landing when the right landing gear collapsed and veered off the runway at the 2012 National Championship Air Races and Air Show in Reno, Nevada. The pilot was uninjured.
 September 1 – Glenn Smith, a member of the HopperFlight Team died at the Quad City Air Show while executing a crossover break maneuver when his Aero L-39C Albatros failed to pull out of a 45-degree bank and crashed when flying in formation at the Davenport Municipal Airport in Davenport, Iowa.
 August 4 – Kent Pietsch crashed his Jelly Belly 1942 Interstate Cadet immediately following the Wetaskiwin Air Show in Wetaskiwin, Alberta, Canada. Just after takeoff, the engine quit and he attempted to turn back for the runway but with insufficient altitude he landed adjacent to the runway and the aircraft hit a ditch, which ripped the wing off. Kent was taken to the hospital in stable condition. He has since returned to the airshow circuit.
 July 1 – Trevor Roche died at the Shuttleworth Military Pageant Airshow in Bedfordshire, when the 1923 de Havilland DH.53 Humming Bird G-EBHX crashed.
 June 30 – Gianfranco Cicogna-Mozzoni died at the Klerksdorp Air Show in South Africa when his Aero L-39 Albatros got into the wake turbulence of the lead aircraft and suffered a compressor stall, followed by a high-speed wing stall, before hitting the ground at a 50-degree angle. The plane exploded on impact.
 June 15 – A Christen Eagle piloted by Ryland "Buck" Roetman crashed while performing a series of outside snap rolls, when the engine lost oil pressure during a preview for the Legacy Airshow in Rexburg, Idaho. The pilot guided the airplane onto an adjacent golf course where it skidded and hit a tree. The pilot suffered a sprained ankle; the aircraft was destroyed.
 June 3 – A Fairey Firefly AS.6 WB518 suffered a landing gear collapse on runway 27R at the Wings over Gillespie airshow in El Cajon, California. The pilot was uninjured.

2011 
 October 14 – The fourth prototype Xian JH-7A, 814, of the China Flight Test Establishment of the People's Liberation Army Air Force crashed into a marsh near Wei Nan City, Pucheng, in Shaanxi, China, while performing in an airshow associated with the China International General Aviation Convention. One pilot ejected safely but the second crewman was killed.
 September 17 – A T-28C Trojan, N688GR, crashed during the Thunder over the Blue Ridge Open House and Air Show in Martinsburg, West Virginia killing pilot John Mangan.
 September 16 – 2011 Reno Air Races crash – Pilot Jimmy Leeward lost control of his highly modified P-51D Mustang, which was named The Galloping Ghost. The Galloping Ghost crashed into spectators and was instantly destroyed at the National Championship Air Races and Air Show, killing 10 spectators, injuring 69 spectators and instantly killing Leeward. The NTSB critically investigated the incident and found that the plane was traveling about  when it experienced a left roll upset at 17.3 Gs and a section of the left elevator trim tab separated in flight. Deteriorated locknut inserts allowed trim tab attachment screws to become loose, ultimately leading to aerodynamic flutter at racing speeds.
 August 21 – Wing walker Todd Green fell  while attempting an aircraft transfer from a Stearman to a Hughes 369 helicopter at the Selfridge Air National Guard Base Air Show in Harrison Township, Michigan. He was seriously injured and taken to the hospital, where he was pronounced dead.
 August 20 – A Royal Air Force Aerobatic Team "Red Arrows" aircraft (BAE Hawk T1) crashed after performing at an air show in Bournemouth, Dorset, United Kingdom. The aircraft was witnessed to have plunged into the ground next to the River Stour, near the village of Throop. The pilot, 33-year-old Flt. Lt. Jon Egging, was killed in the crash.
 August 20 – Stunt pilot Bryan Jensen was killed when his modified Pitts 12 "The Beast" crashed at the Charles B. Wheeler Downtown Airport at the Kansas City Airshow in Kansas City, Missouri, around 1:30 pm.
 July 28 – A General Dynamics F-16C Fighting Falcon, 87–296, of the 187th Fighter Wing, Alabama Air National Guard, flying out of Montgomery Air National Guard Base, overruns the runway at Wittman Regional Airport at the EAA AirVenture Oshkosh airshow in Oshkosh, Wisconsin. The nose gear collapsed, the nose radome broke and the air-frame skidded to a stop. The pilot was uninjured.
The pilot, 67-year-old Joseph Auger, attempted a controlled powerless glide, but the landing gear got caught on cornstalks and flipped over. The pilot was able to extricate himself from the wreckage and sustained only minor injuries.
 June 18 – Christen Eagle II aircraft crashed into the River Wisla at the Air Show in Plock, Poland. The pilot Marek Szufa who was also a pilot of Boeing 767 in Polish airlines LOT died three hours later in a hospital. In his life he spent 20,000 hours in the air and took part in many air shows and championships.
 June 4 – 71-year-old Bill Phipps, an experienced Campbell River, British Columbia pilot, was severely injured while performing aerobatics at the Wings and Wheels event at Nanaimo Airport, British Columbia.
 March 26 – A Yakovlev Yak-52 crashed during the "Wings Over Flagler" airshow held at Flagler County Airport in Florida. It is reported that 58-year-old "Wild Bill" Walker experienced G-LOC during an aerobatic "heart" maneuver and was fatally injured in the resulting crash.
 March 12 – While performing their Pirated Skies wing walking act, Kyle and Amanda Franklin were severely injured when their Waco JMF-7 nicknamed "Mystery Ship", suffered an apparent engine failure at the CAF 2011 Air Fiesta in Brownsville, Texas. Both were listed as in stable condition with burns covering more than 60% of their bodies. Kyle's burns were not as serious as first reported. Amanda had successful surgery March 16, and was believed to have a good recovery chance at that time, but died on May 27.

2010 
 September 5 – A woman was killed when a De Havilland Tiger Moth biplane crashed into spectators at an air show in southern Germany at the Airport Lauf-Lillinghof near Nuremberg. Thirty-eight people were injured in the accident, five of them seriously. Four years later, a trial in Hersbrucker District Court determined that the cause of the crash was pilot error, finding the pilot guilty of "… fahrlässiger Tötung und fahrlässiger Körperverletzung …" (involuntary manslaughter and negligent injury)."
 July 27 - A Hawker Beechcraft 390 piloted by Jack Roush of Roush Performance crashed after stalling at low altitude arriving to the Experimental Aircraft Association's Airventure 2010 fly-in convention in Oshkosh, Wisconsin. Roush was hospitalized for a fractured back, broken jaw, and the loss of his left eye, before being released from the hospital on August 12, 2010. The NTSB determined Roush to be at fault for the accident.
 April 2 – Pilot Captain Anderson Amaro Fernandes was killed when an Embraer EMB 312 Tucano belonging to the "Esquadrilha da Fumaça" aerobatic team of the Brazilian Air Force crashed while performing at a ceremony for 68 years of the Lages aero club in Santa Catarina, Brazil.
 March 3 – Pilot Commander Suresh Kumar Maurya and his co-pilot Lieutenant Commander Rahul Nair were killed when an HAL Kiran aircraft belonging to the Sagar Pawan aerobatic team of the Indian Navy crashed into a building while performing at the opening ceremony of the India Aviation Show at Hyderabad, India. Apart from the two pilots, one person was killed on the ground and at least 5 others injured.

2009 
 November 14 – Overberg Airshow (Bredasdorp, South Africa) – An English Electric Lightning of Thunder City experienced a rear fuselage fire leading to hydraulic failure while performing. The pilot tried to get the aircraft back to base; after failure of the canopy jettison system he was unable to use the ejection seat and the aircraft crashed killing the pilot, Dave Stock, 46.
 September 6 – Brixia Airshow (Montichiari, Italy) – A CAP-10B aircraft hit the ground while performing low altitude aerobatics. Of the two pilots, Marzio Maccarana, 26, was killed and Paolo Castellani, 55, was injured.
 August 30 – Radom Air Show (Radom, Poland) – A Sukhoi Su-27 aircraft from Belarus crashed while performing an air display, killing both pilots, Col. Alexander Morfintsky and Col. Alexander Zhuravlevich.
 July 4 – 4 Air Show (Tehachapi, California) – Pilot Dave Zweigle's L-29 Delfín crashed while making low altitude passes during the airshow. Zweigle and passenger Robert Chamberlain were killed in the accident.

2008
 June 1 – Lake Bracciano Air Show (Lake Bracciano – Province of Rome, Italy) – Aircraft Commander Captain Filippo Fornassi was killed and co-pilot Captain Fabio Manzella was injured when their NH Industries NH90 tactical transport helicopter struck the water and sank into Lake Bracciano. The crash happened while the helicopter was diving after completing a Fieseler Maneuver.
 May 10 – Modesto Airport Appreciation Day (Modesto, California) – Pilot Rob Harrison was injured when the Moravan Otrokovice Zlin 50LX aircraft he was piloting crashed while performing a roll maneuver.
 April 26 – Kindel Air Field (Kindel, Germany) – A Zlin Z-37 Cmelak left the runway on takeoff and veered into a crowd of spectators, killing two and injuring eighteen.
 April 26 – Spirit of Flight 2008 Air Show (Galveston, Texas) – A Supermarine Spitfire taxied into the rear of a recently restored Hawker Hurricane at the Lone Star Flight Museum airshow. No injuries were reported.
The plane landed in a wooded area and caught fire. Nasta, 47, was the sole occupant.

2007
 September 15 – Shoreham Airshow (West Sussex, England) – Pilot Brian Brown was killed when the Hawker Hurricane he was flying failed to pull out of a dive during a mock dogfight.
 September 1 – Radom Air Show (Radom, Poland) – Pilots Piotr Banachowicz and Lech Marchelewski were killed in the mid-air collision of their Zlin Z-526 aircraft.
 July 28 – Dayton Air Show (Dayton, Ohio) – Jim LeRoy was killed when his S2S Bulldog II crashed at the end of the runway while performing a 1/2 Cuban 8 and snap rolls. The reason for this crash was reported as pilot error by the NTSB.
 July 27 – Experimental Aircraft Association's AirVenture show (Oshkosh, Wisconsin) – While approaching the runway for a landing, pilot Gerry Beck's scratch-built P-51A Mustang overtook and struck a P-51D Mustang that had touched down ahead of him. Beck's plane flipped over and crashed along the runway, killing him. The other pilot was not injured, although his P-51D was pushed on its nose and sustained damage to the tail.
 June 24 – Galway Air Show (Galway, Ireland) – Three people on the ground were injured when the door from a hovering RAF helicopter flew off and plunged into a large crowd below.
 April 21 – Blue Angels crash (Marine Corps Air Station Beaufort, Beaufort, South Carolina) – Lieutenant Commander Kevin 'Kojak' Davis of the Blue Angels was killed when he grayed out and lost control of his F/A-18 Hornet.
 March 16 – Tico Airshow (Titusville, Florida) – Pilot Eilon Krugman-Kadi was killed when the Aero L-39 Albatros he was piloting crashed while performing a loop.

2006

 October 14 – Culpeper Airfest (Culpeper Regional Airport, Culpeper, Virginia) – Pilot Nancy Lynn was severely burned when the wingtip of her Extra 300L struck the ground and burst into flames after performing multiple snap rolls on a downline. Lynn succumbed to her injuries later that night at the University of Virginia Medical Center in Charlottesville, Virginia. Lynn's son Pete Muntean was narrating her routine when the accident occurred.
 October 4 – Tucumcari Air Show (Tucumcari, New Mexico) – Pilot Guy "Doc" Baldwin was killed when he lost control of his Extra 300L while performing a loop.

 September 10 – Aero GP of Malta (Marsamxett Harbour, Malta) – Pilot Gabor Varga was killed when the Yak-55 aircraft he was piloting was involved in a mid-air collision with another aircraft. Eddie Goggins, who was piloting an Extra 200, received minor injuries.
 July 30 – Experimental Aircraft Association's AirVenture show (Oshkosh, Wisconsin) – The passenger of a Van's Aircraft RV-6 was killed when the propeller of a Grumman TBM-3 Avenger cut into the fuselage of the RV-6. Both aircraft were taxiing for takeoff at the time of the accident. No injuries were reported from the occupants of the Avenger.
 July 23 – Spanish Guardia Civil (Vigo, Galicia, Spain) Helicopter crashed on the beach during air show.
 July 16 – Oregon International Airshow (Hillsboro, Oregon) – Pilot Robert E. Guilford was killed when his Hawker-Siddeley Hunter Mk 58 lost power and crashed into a residence. Guilford was leaving the airshow on a return trip home.
 May 5 – Children's Day flight exhibition (Suwon Air Base, South Korea) – Captain Kim Do-hyun of the Republic of Korea Air Force's Black Eagles display team was killed when he lost control of his Cessna A-37B Dragonfly.

2005
August 24 – Thunder in the Air Airshow warm-up – (Thunder Bay, Ontario) – Capt. Andrew Mackay of the Canadian Forces Snowbirds safely ejected from his aircraft.
July 26 – Wittman Regional Airport (Oshkosh, Wisconsin) – Pilot Richard James was killed when his North American F-51D crashed while waiting in a holding pattern to perform a "missing man" formation flyover at an airshow.
July 23 – Wings-over-Oklahoma Air Show (Claremore, Oklahoma) – The pilot of a Yakovlev Yak 52 was killed when he crashed inverted and the aircraft caught fire while flying over the runway.
 July 10 – Moose Jaw Air Show (Moose Jaw, Saskatchewan) – Pilots Jimmy Franklin and Bobby Younkin were killed in a mid-air collision during a dogfight routine. At the time of the accident, Franklin was piloting a Waco UPF-7 biplane, and Youkin was piloting a Wolf-Samson biplane, a 1980s replica of the 1948 Pitts Samson.

2004
 October 15 – Marine Corps Air Station Miramar Air Show (Miramar, California) – Stunt pilot Sean DeRosier was killed when his "Cabo Wabo SkyRocker" failed to pull out of a dive.
October 2 – Santa Fe Municipal Airport – Pilot Richard Bobbitt was killed when his 1993 Sukhoi SU-29 stalled and crashed while performing a torque roll.
April 30 – Fort Lauderdale Air & Sea Show – Featured performer Ian Groom died while practicing for the show when his Sukhoi Su-31 dove into the Atlantic Ocean after performing a flat spin.

2003

 September 15 – Gunfighter Skies Air Show (Mountain Home, Idaho) – Pilot error was blamed for the crash of a US Air Force Thunderbirds F-16C. The official report states that the pilot "misinterpreted the altitude required to complete the "Split S" maneuver". The pilot successfully ejected and suffered minor injuries. No other injuries were reported.
September 13 - Moffett Federal Airfield (Mountain View, California) - A pilot suffered minor injuries when his Aviat Pitts S-2C biplane crashed inverted following the wing striking the ground while performing low altitude rolls.
 July 12 – Flying Legends Air Show (Duxford, Cambridgeshire, England) – Lieutenant Commander Bill Murton and Neil Rix were killed when the Fairey Firefly they were in went into a nosedive and never recovered. The plane crashed on the eastern side of the M11 motorway.
 May 31 – Coventry Classic Airshow (Coventry, West Midlands, England) – Swedish pilot Pierre Holländer was killed when his homebuilt replica of Charles Lindbergh's Spirit of St. Louis aircraft crashed. The right wing of the plane broke up at altitude about 100 feet.
March 22 –  Gulf Coast Salute 2003 Airshow (Panama City, Florida) – Pilot Chris Smisson was killed when his Technoavia SP-95 failed to recover from performing a loop and crashed.

2002
 November 10 – Celebrate Freedom Festival Airshow (Columbia, South Carolina) – Pilot Joe Tobul was killed when his F4U-4 Corsair lost power and crashed in a field. At the time of the crash, the plane was part of a flyover formation.
 October 2 – Dabolim Naval Air Base, Goa, India. During the squadron Silver Jubilee Celebrations, two Indian Navy Ilyushin Il-38, IN302 and IN304 collided in mid-air while flying in formation, killing all twelve occupants on board the two aircraft (six on each). The planes were flying parallel to each other in close formation in front of many naval high-ranking officials and their families when their wings touched.
September 29 – Pickaway County Memorial Airport (Circleville, Ohio) – The pilot of a North American AT-6D was killed when his aircraft stalled and crashed, while climbing and turning, following a low level formation flyover.
 August 2 – Lowestoft Seafront Air Festival (Lowestoft, Suffolk, England) – Flight Lieutenant Tony Cann safely ejected from the Harrier GR7 he was piloting after an engine failure. He was performing a 'bow' maneuver at an approximate altitude of 50 feet over the sea at the time of the accident. Footage of the air show Crash was featured on various reality television shows, such as Destroyed in Seconds (2008–09) and Most Daring (2007-2010).
 July 27 – Sknyliv airshow disaster (Sknyliv Airfield Lviv, Ukraine) – Pilot Volodymyr Toponar and co-pilot Yuriy Yegorov of the Ukrainian Air Force demonstration team the Ukrainian Falcons ejected from their Sukhoi Su-27 after the left wing struck the ground during a low altitude roll maneuver. The aircraft then struck a parked Ilyushin Il-76 transport and cartwheeled into a crowd of spectators killing 77, including 28 children and injuring over 500.
 July 21 – Charity Airshow for Thames Valley Air Ambulance (Berkshire, England) – A pilot was injured when his de Havilland Tiger Moth biplane lost altitude rapidly and crash-landed, throwing the 55-year-old pilot clear of the wreckage.
 July 20 – Royal International Air Tattoo (RIAT) airshow (Fairford, Gloucestershire, England) – An Italian Aeritalia G.222 transport made a hard landing which collapsed the nose landing gear. A small fire erupted but was quickly extinguished. No injuries were reported.
 April 20 – Point Mugu air show (Point Mugu, California) – Navy pilot Commander Michael Norman and radar intercept officer Marine Corps Captain Andrew Muhs were killed when their McDonnell-Douglas QF-4S+ Phantom II stalled and crashed after pulling away from a diamond formation. The Navy report stated in part: "The cause of this tragic accident was the failure of the pilot to manage the energy state of the aircraft, and then to recognize a departure from controlled flight at low altitude, and apply the NATOPS recovery techniques."

2001
 July 9 – Sarnia International Airshow (Sarnia, Ontario, Canada) – Pilot Carey Moore was killed when his newly restored Hawker Sea Fury stalled during a tight bank just east of the airport, crashing into a soybean field. Pilot Moore was about to commence his third pass when he lost power while banking to return to show centre.
 June 4 – (Rouen, France) – Pilot Martin Sargeant was killed while making an emergency landing in his Supermarine Spitfire, due to engine failure. He tried to land on the designated emergency grass strip, but it was occupied by spectators. In an attempt to turn to a hard runway, his aircraft stalled and crashed.
 June 3 – During the Biggin Hill Airshow a 1944 Bell P-63 Kingcobra crashed killing the pilot, former Red Arrow Guy Bancroft-Wilson. The American World War II fighter aircraft had been flying an unplanned sequence, when the pilot lost control at the top of a climbing manoeuvre and was unable to recover from the resulting dive. The aircraft impacted the ground to the west of the runway in a steep nose down attitude. The incident was captured on video.
 June 2 – During the Biggin Hill Airshow a vintage de Havilland Vampire jet crashed, killing both pilots. The Vampire had been flying a display in tandem with a Sea Vixen, the likely cause of the accident was that the Vampire's flight path had been disrupted by wake turbulence from the larger aircraft.
August 11 – During an airshow in Michelstadt, Germany, a Fokker Dr.1 replica triplane crashed into a field outside the show area, killing the pilot. The BFU report says that the cause of the accident was a damaged piece of metal in the vertical stabilizer that broke during flight and made the vertical stabilizer, and in consequence the whole plane, uncontrollable.

See also
List of air show accidents and incidents in the 20th century
List of accidents and incidents involving commercial aircraft
List of air shows
List of news aircraft accidents and incidents
Lists of accidents and incidents involving military aircraft

References

Airshow